Wasted Heart is the first EP, and third release overall, by American rock band Loaded.

Background
Following Scott Weiland's departure from Velvet Revolver on April 21, 2008 Loaded decided to regroup and record a new full-length album, with Velvet Revolver being put on hiatus until a new singer was found. After a few jam sessions, Loaded began recording what would become Sick with Dark Days producer Martin Feveyear at Jupiter Studios in Seattle, Washington. After signing a deal with Century Media the band began performing under the moniker Duff McKagan's Loaded to help promote the band further.

Wasted Heart was released September 22, 2008 to coincide with their European Tour although it was available before the release date during the UK Tour. A music video for the song "No More" was shot to promote the EP.

All of the EP tracks were later featured on Loaded's second album Sick with the exception of the EP exclusive track "Executioner's Song" as well as "Wasted Heart" (the EP version is acoustic while the album version is electric). "Executioner's Song" was later re-recorded for the band's third album The Taking, released in 2011.

Track listing

Personnel
Loaded
Duff McKagan – lead vocals, rhythm guitar
Mike Squires – lead guitar, backing vocals 
Jeff Rouse – bass guitar, backing vocals
Geoff Reading – drums, backing vocals
Production personnel
Martin Feveyear– production, mixing, mastering, additional percussion
Jon Ervie – mixing assistance

References

2008 EPs
Loaded (band) albums
Albums produced by Martin Feveyear